The Super League is the top professional rugby league club competition in the Northern Hemisphere.

Super League may also refer to:

Athletics
 Super League, the winners of the European Cup athletics competition

Association football
 Argentine Primera División, former name of the Argentine Superliga
 Belgian Women's Super League (Super League Vrouwenvoetbal)
 Chinese Super League
 Danish Superliga
 European Super League
 England's FA Women's Super League (aka FA WSL)
 Football Superleague of Kosovo
 Indian Super League
 Indonesia Super League
 Iraq Super League
 Kazakhstan Super League
 Malaysia Super League
 Nepal Super League
 North American SuperLiga
 Serbian SuperLiga
 South Australian Super League
 Super League of Belize
 Super League Greece
 Swiss Super League
 Super League of Malawi
 Turkish Süper Lig
 Ugandan Super League
 Uzbekistan Super League
 Zambia Super League

Badminton
 China Badminton Super League

Bandy
 Russian Bandy Super League

Basketball
 Irish Super League, the highest basketball league on the island of Ireland
 Israeli Basketball Super League, the highest professional league in Israel
 Russian Basketball Super League, since 2010–11 the second-tier professional league in Russia
 Turkish Basketball Super League, the highest professional league in Turkey
 Ukrainian Basketball SuperLeague, the highest professional league in Ukraine

Cricket
 ICC Cricket World Cup Super League
 Pakistan Super League
 Women's Cricket Super League
 Women's T20 Super League

Floorball
 Swedish Super League (men's floorball)
 Swedish Super League (women's floorball)

Handball
 Russian Handball Super League

Ice Hockey
 Ice Hockey Superleague, a defunct British competition
 Russian Superleague

Kabaddi
Super Kabaddi League, the professional kabaddi league in Pakistan

Motorsport
 Superleague Formula, a football club themed racing series that operated from 2008 to 2011

Netball
 Netball Superleague, the highest league in British netball
 Netball Super League, the highest netball league in Singapore

Rugby League
 RFL Super League, the top division of the British rugby league system
 RFL Women's Super League, the equivalent women's competition
 RFL Women's Super League South, an expansion leage for southern rugby league clubs (2021 to 2023)
 Super League (Australia), a competitor league to what is now the National Rugby League
 Super League International Board, defunct international governing body for Super League-aligned nations

Rugby Union
 Rugby Canada Super League
 Rugby Super League (United States) (defunct)
 Súper Liga Americana de Rugby

Table Tennis
 China Table Tennis Super League
 TTV Super League (Table Tennis Victoria Super League), Australia

Triathlon
 Super League Triathlon

Volleyball
 Brazilian Men's Volleyball Super League
 Brazilian Women's Volleyball Super League
 Russian Volleyball Super League

Other uses 
 European Super League (disambiguation)
 Super League, a 1987 Sega arcade baseball video game, predecessor of Tommy Lasorda Baseball (1989)

See also

 
 
 
 
 
 
 Super Cup
 Super Hockey League
 Elite League (disambiguation)
 Superliga (disambiguation)
Super Ligue (disambiguation)
 League (disambiguation)